Pediasia pseudopersella is a moth in the family Crambidae. It was described by Stanisław Błeszyński in 1959. It is found in Iran, where it has been recorded from the Elburz Mountains.

References

Crambini
Moths described in 1959
Moths of Asia